The 1st GLAAD Media Awards was held by GLAAD on April 29, 1990 at the Time & Life Building, New York City to honor “fair, accurate and inclusive” representations of LGBT individuals in the media during the 1989 season.

The awards' first year was a small event, with only 34 nominees and seven categories. The first award looked different from the current one - it was a small, square-shaped crystal sculpture that had an etching of the year it was presented, along with the title of the award "GLAAD Media Award". The awards were awarded according to criteria similar to those on other awards shows, but with the added requirement of somehow addressing LGBT+ issues and representation.

GLAAD honored Phil Donahue as the Media Person of the Year for his continued coverage of the LGBT community, and GLAAD co-founder Vito Russo joined him onstage. Other honorees included As the World Turns (Daytime Drama), L.A. Law (Drama Series) and Common Threads: Stories from the Quilt (TV Documentary).

Winners
 Outstanding Daytime Drama: As the World Turns
 Outstanding Comedy Series: Doctor Doctor
 Outstanding Drama Series: Heartbeat and L.A. Law (tie)
 Outstanding Comedy Episode: The Tracey Ullman Show
 Outstanding Drama Episode: thirtysomething
 Outstanding TV Documentary: Common Threads: Stories from the Quilt 
 Outstanding TV Mini-Series: The Women of Brewster Place
 Special Recognition: Out in the 90's (broadcast by Gay Cable Network)

References

GLAAD Media Awards ceremonies
GLAAD Media Awards
GLAAD Media Awards
GLAAD Media Awards
1990s in Manhattan
Lists of LGBT-related award winners and nominees